John Tidwell may refer to:
 John Tidwell (basketball)
 John Tidwell (politician)